Lame is a studio album by American hip hop artist IAME, a member of the Pacific Northwest hip hop collective Oldominion. It was released May 31, 2011 on both Taxidermy Records and Heaven Noise.

Music 
The album is entirely produced by Smoke M2D6. Guest appearances include Sapient, Toni Hill, Smoke M2D6, SolIllaquists Of Sound, Gold, Poeina Suddarth and Xperience.

Track listing 
All tracks produced by Smoke M2D6.

References

External links 
 Lame at Bandcamp
 Lame at Discogs

2011 albums
Hip hop albums by American artists
Pacific Northwest hip hop albums